Adipapam is a 1988 Indian Malayalam-language erotic film directed and filmed by P. Chandrakumar and produced by R. B. Choudary. It is based on the Old Testament and features Vimal Raja and Abhilasha as Adam and Eve, respectively. Upon release, the film grossed ₹2.5 crore against a budget of ₹7.5 lakh. The film was released in Tamil as Muthal Paavam.

Cast
 Vimal Raja as Adam
 Abhilasha as Eve

Soundtrack
The music was composed by Jerry Amaldev and Usha Khanna, with lyrics written by Devadas.

Reception
The film, made at a budget of  750,000, grossed  25 million. It is regarded as the first successful Malayalam film with softcore nudity. The success of the film inspired a series of similar productions in the next few years. Chandrakumar himself went on to direct eight more adult films and Abhilasha became the most sought B-grade actress.

References

External links
 
 Adipapam at Spicevienna.org

1980s Malayalam-language films
1980s pornographic films
1988 films
Indian erotic films
Films based on the Book of Genesis
Cultural depictions of Adam and Eve
Films directed by P. Chandrakumar
Super Good Films films
Christian mass media in India